Heterogenite is a natural tri-valent cobalt oxyhydroxide mineral. It is one of the most important cobalt resources in the world, about 70% of which is located in DR Congo.

The name heterogenite came from Greek, "of another kind", as the mineral differs in composition from similar minerals. Its formation is likely related to the weathering of carrollite (CuCo2S4). In nature it is found coexisting with other minerals like smaltite, pharmacosiderite, calcite, linnaeite, sphaerocobaltite, malachite and cuprite.

References 

Natural materials
Minerals